H. G. Sirisena was the 4th Chief Minister of Southern Province. He was appointed on 21 December 2001 succeeding Mahinda Yapa Abeywardena and was Chief Minister until 18 July 2004. He was succeeded by Shan Wijayalal De Silva.

References

Chief Ministers of Southern Province, Sri Lanka